The 2011 MENA Golf Tour was the inaugural season of the MENA Golf Tour.

Schedule
The following table lists official events during the 2011 season.

Order of Merit
The Order of Merit was based on prize money won during the season, calculated in U.S. dollars. Ahmed Marjane led the amateur Order of Merit.

Notes

References

MENA Golf Tour